Aberdeenshire West (Gaelic: Siorrachd Obar Dheathain an Iar) is a constituency of the Scottish Parliament (Holyrood) covering part of the council area of Aberdeenshire. It elects one Member of the Scottish Parliament (MSP) by the first past the post method of election. Also, however, it is one of ten constituencies in the North East Scotland electoral region, which elects seven additional members, in addition to ten constituency MSPs, to produce a form of proportional representation for the region as a whole.

The seat has been held by Alexander Burnett of the Scottish Conservatives since the 2016 Scottish Parliament election.

Electoral region

The other nine constituencies of the North East Scotland region are Aberdeen Central, Aberdeen Donside, Aberdeen South and North Kincardine, Aberdeenshire East, Angus North and Mearns, Angus South, Banffshire and Buchan Coast, Dundee City East and Dundee City West.

The region covers all of the Aberdeen City council area, the Aberdeenshire council area, the Angus council area, the Dundee City council area and part of the Moray council area.

Constituency boundaries and council area

Aberdeenshire is represented by five constituencies in the Scottish Parliament: Aberdeen South and North Kincardine, Aberdeenshire East, Aberdeenshire West, Angus North and Mearns and Banffshire and Buchan Coast.

The electoral wards used in the creation of Aberdeenshire West are:

In full: West Garioch; Westhill and District; Huntly, Strathbogie and Howe of Alford; Aboyne, Upper Deeside and Donside; Banchory and Mid-Deeside
In part: East Garioch (shared with Aberdeenshire East), Stonehaven and Lower Deeside (shared with Angus North and Mearns)

Constituency profile and voting patterns

Constituency profile
The Aberdeenshire West constituency is an affluent rural constituency located along the western side of the Aberdeenshire council area. To the south of the constituency is Royal Deeside, located along the Valleys of the River Dee, which includes the affluent towns of Aboyne and Banchory and their surrounding rural areas. Along the western end of Royal Deeside is the Cairngorms National Park, covering Queen Elizabeth II's estate of Balmoral Castle. North-east of Deeside is the town of Westhill, which functions as a suburb to the city of Aberdeen. North of here, along the Valleys of the River Don in the area known as "Gordon", is Huntly, home to the Gordon Highlanders,  and the former Royal Burgh of Kintore, which has developed into an Aberdonian suburb, with a near doubling of the town's population throughout the 2000s. The constituency is among the least deprived parts of Scotland, with slight deprivation in the south-west of Huntly, and high rates of affluence elsewhere.

Oil and agriculture form a significant part of the local economy, with tourist interests around Royal Deeside. The constituency also covers the Royal Lochnagar distillery located to the west of Royal Deeside.

Voting patterns
The Aberdeenshire West constituency was formed in 2011 from parts of the former constituencies of Gordon and West Aberdeenshire and Kincardine. From the establishment of the Scottish Parliament in 1999 until 2007 these constituencies were both represented by the Liberal Democrats. In 2007, Gordon was gained by the SNP's Alex Salmond, who served as the First Minister of Scotland from 2007 until 2014.

In the 2012 local council election, the Conservative vote in areas covered by the Aberdeenshire West constituency tended to be strongest around Royal Deeside, covering the villages of Aboyne, Ballater and Banchory, and to a lesser extent around Westhill and its surrounding areas. The rural region of Garioch, situated along the River Don and its tributary streams, tended to be better for the SNP and Liberal Democrats.

Member of the Scottish Parliament

Election results

2020s

2010s

References

External links

Politics of Aberdeenshire
Scottish Parliament constituencies and regions from 2011
Constituencies established in 2011
Constituencies of the Scottish Parliament
2011 establishments in Scotland
Huntly
Ballater
Banchory
Kintore, Aberdeenshire